Wildfire is the third studio album and the first major record label debut album by American singer and songwriter Rachel Platten. It was released on January 1, 2016, by Columbia Records and Sony Music Entertainment. 

The album was a commercial success. It debuted at number five on the US Billboard 200, with 45,000 album-equivalent units (29,000 from pure album sales) in its first week. On March 9, 2016, the album was certified gold by the Recording Industry Association of America (RIAA) for combined sales and streaming equivalent units of 500,000 units.

The album includes "Fight Song", released in February 2015, which peaked at number six on the Billboard Hot 100, and topped the charts in Scotland and the United Kingdom. The album's second single, "Stand by You", was released on September 11, 2015. The album's third single, "Better Place", was released on March 24, 2016. The album was promoted by Platten's first Headline tour "The Wildfire tour".

Promotion

Singles
On February 19, 2015, "Fight Song" was released as the lead single from Platten's Fight Song EP. "Fight Song" peaked at number six on the US Billboard Hot 100 and topped the UK Singles Chart. "Stand by You" was released as the lead single from Wildfire on September 11, 2015. It has since peaked at number thirty seven on the Billboard Hot 100. The songs "Lone Ranger", "Beating Me Up", and "Congratulations" were available as pre-order singles (previously released as part of the Fight Song EP), as well as "Better Place". On March 24, 2016, "Better Place" was released as the third single from the album.

Tour
To promote the album, Platten embarked on her first headlining concert tour, entitled The Wildfire Tour. The tour began on February 26, 2016, in Dallas, Texas and ended in November 2016 in Los Angeles.

Critical reception

Wildfire received mixed reviews from music critics. At Metacritic, which assigns a normalized rating out of 100 to reviews from mainstream critics, the album has an average score of 52 out of 100, which indicates "mixed or average reviews" based on four reviews. Stephen Thomas Erlewine of AllMusic rated the album three out of five stars and states: "Platten specializes in skyscraping melodies and big, bombastic surfaces and these are the elements that not only fuel Wildfire, they distinguish it from the singer/songwriter's clear antecedents." At Digital Journal, Markos Papadatos rated the album an "A", affirming that "Rachel Platten has set the bar high already with her brand new album, Wildfire. There are no filler tracks on this release. It garners an A rating." Tony Clayton-Lea of The Irish Times rated the album three stars out of five and states the songs are "Pop songs built to withstand a wrecking ball." In a positive review for The Red and Black, Emma Korstanje writes the album "is made memorable by her juxtaposition of sassy, confident songs with others featuring raw emotion."

Track listing

Personnel
Musicians

 Rachel Platten – vocals (all tracks), piano (5, 7), acoustic guitar (7)
 Jon Levine – bass, keyboards (1–6, 8, 10–12); drum programming (1), piano (1, 3, 4, 6, 8–12), guitar (2, 5, 11), organ (2, 7, 9), programming (2–5, 8, 10–12), strings (4)
 Aaron Sterling – drums (1, 3, 4, 8, 10)
 Jon Sosin – guitar (1, 3, 4, 6, 11), ukulele (4)
 Donald Hayes – alto saxophone, tenor saxophone (2)
 Jacob Sceney – baritone saxophone (2)
 Lemar Guillary – trombone (2)
 Cameron Johnson – trumpet (2)
 Andy Grammer – vocals (2)
 Evan Kidd Bogart – vocals (2)
 Simon Huber – cello (3, 6, 11)
 Andrew Wells – guitar (3)
 Sonia Rao – violin (3)
 The International Agape Choir – background vocals (7)
 Marc Rogers – bass (7)
 Dash Hutton – drums (7, 9)
 Brian West – programming (7, 9), synthesizer (7); guitar, vocals (9)
 Aubrey Cleland – background vocals (9)
 Donnie Anderson – background vocals (9)
 Nash Overstreet – background vocals, electric guitar, percussion (9)
 Maxwell Roach – drums (12)

Technical
 Tom Coyne – mastering
 Eric Boulanger – mastering (7, 11)
 Joe Zook – mixing (1–6, 8–12)
 Nick Radovanovic – mixing (7)
 Dan Piscina – engineering
 Brian West – engineering (7, 9)
 Scott Elgin – engineering (7, 9)
 Jeremy Miller – engineering assistance (2)

Charts

Weekly charts

Year-end charts

Certifications

Release history

References

2016 albums
Rachel Platten albums
Columbia Records albums